Amphimallon krali is a species of beetle in the Melolonthinae subfamily that is endemic to Dodecanese islands.

References

Beetles described in 2002
krali